Rheinfelden District lies in the northwest of the canton of Aargau in Switzerland, in the Fricktal region. Its capital is Rheinfelden. Around 88% of the population live in the conurbation of Basel. The population density is around 355 persons per square kilometre.

Geography
Of this area,  or 44.0% is used for agricultural purposes, while  or 39.7% is forested. Of the rest of the land,  or 13.4% is settled (buildings or roads).

Demographics
, 21.3% of the population are foreign nationals.

Economy
 there were 19,081 workers who lived in the district.  Of these, 13,553 or about 71.0% of the residents worked outside the Rheinfelden district while 8,272 people commuted into the district for work.  There were a total of 13,800 jobs (of at least 6 hours per week) in the district.

Religion
Of the rest of the population, there were 2 474 who belonged to the Christian Catholic faith.

Education
Of the school age population, there are 3,090 students attending primary school, there are 1,111 students attending secondary school, there are 734 students attending tertiary or university level schooling, and there are 32 students who are seeking a job after school in the municipality.

Municipalities

References 

Districts of Aargau